Philip Stanhope, 5th Earl of Chesterfield KG, PC, FRS, FSA (10 November 1755 – 29 August 1815), known as Philip Stanhope until 1773, was a British politician and diplomat. He was British Ambassador to Spain between 1784 and 1787, Master of the Mint between 1789 and 1790, Joint Postmaster General between 1790 and 1798 and Master of the Horse between 1798 and 1804.

Background and education
Stanhope was the son of Arthur Charles Stanhope, of Mansfield Woodhouse, and Margaret, daughter and co-heiress of Charles Headlam, of Kerby Hall, Yorkshire, and cousin, godson and, later, adopted son of Philip Stanhope, 4th Earl of Chesterfield (whose titles he inherited at his death in 1773). He was a great-great-great-grandson of Philip Stanhope, 1st Earl of Chesterfield. His adoptive father directed his early education and his tutors included the poet Cuthbert Shaw and Edward Gibbon's friend the Swiss Jacques Georges Deyverdun, as well as Adam Ferguson, Professor of Moral Philosophy at the University of Edinburgh, and the forger Dr William Dodd. He was later educated at the University of Leipzig, Saxony. During his service in Germany he became a member of the Masonic Lodge Minerva zu den drei Palmen Leipzig in 1773.

Political and diplomatic career
Lord Chesterfield became a favourite of George III. In 1784 he was sworn of the Privy Council and appointed Ambassador to Spain, a post he held until 1787, although he never went to Spain. He later held office under William Pitt the Younger as Master of the Mint between 1789 and 1790 and as joint Postmaster General between 1790 and 1798 and under Pitt and Henry Addington as Master of the Horse between 1798 and 1804. 

Lord Chesterfield was also Lord Lieutenant of Buckinghamshire between 1781 and 1782. He was elected a Fellow of both the Royal Society and the Society of Antiquaries in 1776. In 1805 he was appointed a Knight of the Garter.

Family

Lord Chesterfield married firstly, Anne, daughter of Reverend Robert Thistlewayte, on 20 August 1777. They had one child:

Lady Harriet Stanhope (d. 1803), died unmarried.

After his first wife's death in October 1798 he married secondly, Lady Henrietta Thynne, daughter of Thomas Thynne, 1st Marquess of Bath, on 2 May 1799. They had two children:

Lady Georgiana Stanhope (d. 1824), married Frederick Richard West, a grandson of John West, 2nd Earl De La Warr. The marriage was childless.
George Stanhope, 6th Earl of Chesterfield (1805–1866).
 
The Countess of Chesterfield died at Chesterfield House, Mayfair, London, in May 1813, aged 50. Lord Chesterfield survived her by two years and died at Bretby, Derbyshire, in August 1815, aged 59. He was succeeded in the earldom by his only son, George.

References

1755 births
1815 deaths
Knights of the Garter
Lord-Lieutenants of Buckinghamshire
Masters of the Mint
Members of the Privy Council of Great Britain
Ambassadors of Great Britain to Spain
Philip
Fellows of the Royal Society
Earls of Chesterfield
People from Mansfield Woodhouse